Nursing is self-regulated in Ireland. The regulatory body is An Bord Altranais (The Nursing Board). The board was established under the 1950 Nurses Act and currently operates under the 1985 Nurses Act. There are currently over 82,000 nurses registered by An Bord Altranais of which over 65,000 are on the active register ABA Statistics 2006.

There are currently nine divisions of the register: nurse prescriber, advanced nurse practitioner, general, psychiatric, children's, intellectual disability, midwifery, public health and tutor.

Developments
Following Henry VII’s dissolution of monasteries, nursing became near non-existent in Ireland for almost three hundred years. The easing of the Penal laws allowed the emergence of volunteer associations of women who formed to aid the sick such as the Sisters of Mercy led by Catherine McAuley and Irish Sisters of Charity led by Mary Aikenhead. 

In parallel, nursing as a public service was also practised by the inmates of workhouses; this is notable as the network of workhouses and infirmaries are the precursor of modern Irish health via key legislation such as the Medical Charities Act of 1851 and reviews of the Poor laws such as 1868. However, nursing as a regulated profession in Ireland began when the Irish Workhouse Association, which was formed in 1896, demanded that staff must be formally qualified. Significant changes have occurred in Irish nursing since the publication of Report of The Commission on Nursing, A blueprint for the future.

Nurse education
Pre-registration nurse education is university and college based. All pre-registration programmes are at degree level (NQAI level 8). Nurse registration education programmes are governed An Bord Altranais Requirements & Standards.

Significant developments have occurred in post registration nurse education with a variety of programs available to nurses to support their practice and develop their career.

References

External links
The Irish Nursing Journals Collection, a collection of 20th century journals pertaining to the Irish Nurses and Midwives Organisation. A UCD Digital Library Collection.